Hippolyte Victor Roger Mattelé (10 August 1921 – 2006) was a Belgian rower. He competed at the 1952 Summer Olympics in Helsinki with the men's coxed pair where they were eliminated in the semi-final repêchage.

References

1921 births
2006 deaths 
Belgian male rowers
Olympic rowers of Belgium
Rowers at the 1952 Summer Olympics
Sportspeople from Antwerp
European Rowing Championships medalists